Michael van Lingen (born 24 October 1997) is a Namibian cricketer. In January 2016, he was named in Namibia's squad for the 2016 Under-19 Cricket World Cup. He was one of the most successful bowlers at the tournament, and was also praised during Namibia's surprise victory over South Africa when he walked after being caught behind despite the umpire not giving him out. He made his first-class debut for Northerns on 3 March 2016 in the Sunfoil 3-Day Cup tournament.

In March 2021, he was named in Namibia's Twenty20 International (T20I) squad for their series against Uganda. In September 2021, he was named in Namibia's squad for the 2021 ICC Men's T20 World Cup. He was also named in Namibia's T20I squad for the 2021 Summer T20 Bash, played just before the World Cup. He made his T20I debut on 10 October 2021, for Namibia against Papua New Guinea.

In November 2021, he was named in Namibia's One Day International (ODI) squad for the 2021 Namibia Tri-Nation Series. He made his ODI debut on 26 November 2021, for Namibia against Oman.

References

External links
 

1997 births
Living people
Namibian cricketers
Namibia One Day International cricketers
Namibia Twenty20 International cricketers
Place of birth missing (living people)